Clive Wesley Smith (1 October 1923 – 18 April 1999) was an  Australian rules footballer who played with North Melbourne in the Victorian Football League (VFL).

He later served in the Australian Army during World War II.

Notes

External links 

1923 births
1999 deaths
Australian rules footballers from Victoria (Australia)
North Melbourne Football Club players
Werribee Football Club players
Australian Army personnel of World War II
Military personnel from Victoria (Australia)
People from Werribee, Victoria